Gages Lake is a census-designated place (CDP) in Warren Township, Lake County, Illinois, United States. The population was 10,637 at the 2020 census.

Geography
The CDP is located in central Lake County at  (42.3520277, -87.9829260). It is in southwestern Warren Township and is bordered to the north and east by the village of Gurnee, to the northwest by the village of Third Lake, and to the west by the village of Grayslake. The water body of Gages Lake is in the western part of the CDP and extends into the village of Third Lake. The CDP includes the communities of Idlewild and Wildwood.

U.S. Route 45 runs along the western edge of the community, leading south  to Mundelein and north  to Bristol, Wisconsin. Illinois Route 120 runs along the southern edge, leading east  to Waukegan and west  to Hainesville.

Demographics

2020 census

2000 Census
As of the census of 2000, there were 10,415 people, 3,725 households, and 2,793 families residing in the CDP. The racial makeup of the CDP was 91.93% White, 2.02% African American, 0.27% Native American, 3.12% Asian, 0.01% Pacific Islander, 1.42% from other races, and 1.24% from two or more races. Hispanic or Latino of any race were 4.19% of the population.

There were 3,725 households, out of which 43.0% had children under the age of 18 living with them, 63.4% were married couples living together, 8.6% had a female householder with no husband present, and 25.0% were non-families. 20.1% of all households were made up of individuals, and 5.3% had someone living alone who was 65 years of age or older. The average household size was 2.79 and the average family size was 3.26.

In the CDP, the population was spread out, with 30.2% under the age of 18, 5.8% from 18 to 24, 35.5% from 25 to 44, 21.8% from 45 to 64, and 6.7% who were 65 years of age or older. The median age was 35 years. For every 100 females, there were 98.3 males. For every 100 females age 18 and over, there were 94.8 males.

The median income for a household in the CDP was $71,750, and the median income for a family was $79,395. Males had a median income of $56,320 versus $37,790 for females. The per capita income for the CDP was $28,391. About 1.4% of families and 3.0% of the population were below the poverty line, including 1.9% of those under age 18 and 4.0% of those age 65 or over.

See also
List of census-designated places in Illinois

References

Census-designated places in Illinois
Census-designated places in Lake County, Illinois